Nonie Tao Eu, a.k.a. Nonie (SAG name) and Tao Kwun-Mei 陶君薇 (Cantonese name), is an American-born Chinese film actress, TV personality and MTV Asia and Channel V video jockey and producer in the early 1990s. She hosted Dial MTV, MTV Most Wanted, BY Demand and Asian Top 20.

US-born Nonie graduated from the University of Washington majoring in political science and drama. In Taiwan, she starred in television series, hosted her own variety shows, and endorsed a number of commercials. In Hong Kong she starred in the films Evil Black Magic, Finale in Blood, A Touch of Class, and The Bride with White Hair 2. She guest-starred in the U.K. television series Soldier Soldier. In America, she guest-starred in William Boyles Jr. television series, Under Cover. Nonie was also featured on Good Morning America with Charles Gibson.

She was one of the first VJs for MTV Asia when it was launched in September 1991. Her shows on STAR TV were broadcast to 38 countries in Asia and Middle East - from Tokyo to Tehran, from Mongolia to Malaysia, and all of China and India before STAR TV split the beams into different languages and regions. Nonie continued to produce shows for all of their English and Chinese speaking channels. Her popularity saw her in demand for commercial endorsements including securing a six-figure deal with Pepsi Cola and becoming the first international celebrity endorsement for Philippine clothing brand Bench After MTV, she joined STAR TV as a co-producer and VJ where she also had a radio show. As one of the early VJs in Asia, she developed a huge following in Taiwan, Singapore, Dubai, the Philippines, and India. In 1992 India Times proclaimed Nonie as "More famous than Princess Diana". She received hundreds of fan letters per day as a MTV Asia VJ.

Nonie Tao Eu is the granddaughter of Q.L. Dao, founder of Voh Kee & Co. The company was one of the largest construction firms in China and was regarded by one publication as "China's Foremost Constructor". Voh Kee & Co. was commissioned by the Chinese Government to build Dr. Sun Yat Sen's Memorial Auditorium in Guangzhou, the Mausoleum of Dr. Sun Yat Sen in Nanking, Memorial to War Heros in Nanking, as well as various bridges, naval docks and river locks. Voh Kee & Co. was also responsible for building the National Revolutionary Martyr's Shrine in Taipei, Taiwan. In 1992, China Published a biography on Q.L.Dao's life and honored him in the Construction Museum in Nantong, China.

Personal life
In the early-1990s, Nonie wed Jardine Fleming Finance fund director Douglas Eu in Maui, Hawaii. Douglas Eu is the son of Andrew Eu, the first managing director of the TVB television station in Hong Kong. Douglas is the grandson of Eu Tong Sen, founder of the Chinese medicine company Eu Yan Sang. Eu Yan Sang has over 230 retail outlets in Hong Kong, Macau, Singapore, Malaysia, China, Australia.

In 1996, Nonie left her duties as host of Channel V's Asian Top-20 to have three children.

References

External links

 Ruth Winona Tao in a San Miguel commercial circa 1990s 
 Official fan page on Ruth Winona Tao [MTV VJ Nonie Tao [official Fan Page]https://www.facebook.com/groups/340269827483/

1963 births
Living people
American people of Chinese descent
VJs (media personalities)
University of Washington College of Arts and Sciences alumni